Cundy v Lindsay (1877–78) LR 3 App Cas 459 is an English contract law case on the subject of mistake, introducing the concept that contracts could be automatically void for mistake as to identity, where it is of crucial importance. Some lawyers argue that such a rule is at odds with subsequent cases of mistake as to identity, such as Phillips v Brooks, where parties contracting face to face are merely voidable for fraud, protecting a third party buyer. However, the ultimate question is whether the identity of the other contracting party was crucial to the contract. The problem for the courts was essentially which of the two innocent parties should bear the loss of the goods.

Facts
Lindsay & Co sued Cundy to return handkerchiefs, after it had been defrauded by a 'rogue' that sold them onto Cundy. Lindsay & Co were manufacturers of linen handkerchiefs, amongst other things. They received correspondence from a man named Blenkarn. He had rented a room at 37 Wood Street, Cheapside, but purported to be 'Blenkiron & Co'. Lindsay & Co knew of a reputable business of this name which resided at 123 Wood Street. Believing the correspondence to be from this company, Lindsay & Co delivered to Blenkarn a large order of handkerchiefs. Blenkarn then sold the goods – 250 dozen linen handkerchiefs – to an innocent third party, Cundy. When Blenkarn failed to pay, Lindsay & Co sued Cundy for the goods.

Judgment

Divisional Court
The Divisional Court held that Lindsay could not recover the handkerchiefs from Cundy. Blackburn J, giving judgment, held the following.

Mellor J and Lush J agreed.

Court of Appeal
The Court of Appeal, with Mellish LJ, Brett J and Amphlett JA overturned the Divisional Court, holding that Lindsay could recover the handkerchiefs, since the mistake about the identity of the rogue voided the contract from the start. Cundy appealed.

House of Lords
The House of Lords held that Lindsay & Co had meant to deal only with Blenkiron & Co. There could therefore have been no agreement or contract between them and the rogue. Accordingly, title did not pass to the rogue, and could not have passed to Cundy. He therefore had to return the goods.

Lord Cairns explained the mistake as to identity, and the consequences:

Developments
The contract was held void, rather than voidable. This has introduced a distinction from cases such as Phillips v Brooks, where parties dealing face to face are presumed to contract with each other. Despite still being good law, commentators, as well as the courts, have been critical of this distinction. In Shogun Finance Ltd v Hudson  Lord Nicholls, dissenting, stated it to be an "eroded" principle of law.

See also
 King's Norton Metal Co v Edridge Merrett & Co
 Mistake in English law

Notes

References
 C MacMillan, 'Mistake as to identity clarified?' (2004) 120 Law Quarterly Review 369

English mistake case law
House of Lords cases
1878 in case law
1878 in British law